Ryan Verra is a Canadian entrepreneur and professional race car driver from Calgary. In 2014 he became the first Canadian driver to race in the Fórmula 3 Brasil Series, earning 2 podium finishes for the season and becoming the first Canadian with a podium finish in Brazil since Jacques Villeneuve in 1997.

Early life

Verra was born in 1982 in Calgary, Alberta, Canada. He began with sports at an early age, starting with motocross at the age of eight as well as various forms of martial arts.

Career

Verra began his career in martial arts, marketing, and television. He opened his own fight club and numerous gyms, teaching and training in mixed martial arts. Verra performed a martial arts event at Stampede Corral in 2008. After the event, he was approached by a television company who hired him to produce a television show related to martial arts. Verra produced the lifestyle news show which aired for one year on the Fight Network. 

Verra began a new venture when he took up auto sports as a professional race car driver. He began his career with numerous top 10 finishes in both the Skip Barber F2000 Series as well as the F1000 Championship. In 2012 he was invited to test with Afterburner Autosport at the Indianapolis Motor Speedway before joining the team of Alliance Autosport in 2013. Verra had no Karting experience prior to joining Alliance, making his debut in the American 2013 U.S. F2000 National Championship, an open wheel racing series that is part of the Road to Indy. He drove the season in a Van Diemen DP06 Formula SCCA Mazda. He had a total of 12 podium finishes, with his first career win in the National Class coming at Mazda Raceway Laguna Seca. He also suffered a crash in the Grand Prix of St. Petersburg before returning to racing two races later. Prior to 2014, Verra had LASIK to correct his vision. The surgery was unsuccessful, leaving his right eye unable to see clearly and he was not cleared to race. He rehabilitated the eye and was able to return to racing for 2014.

In 2014, Verra signed with RR Racing to race for the 2014 Fórmula 3 Brasil season. This was the first season for the series since 1995 and replaced the Formula 3 Sudamericana as the highest profile Formula series in South America. Verra drove a Dallara F301 with Pirelli Tyres and a Berta engine. He had a podium appearance at Velopark that was later disputed. He returned to Brazil later that year and raced in the final round of the series at Autódromo Internacional Ayrton Senna where he had two more podium finishes. He finished in 8th place for the series and was the first and only Canadian driver in the series. He was also the first Canadian driver to reach a podium in any race in Brazil since Jacques Villeneuve did it in 1997.

Racing statistics

2014 Fórmula 3 Brasil (Class B)

Philanthropy

Verra has been involved in philanthropy, partnering with the Cancer Research Society to launch a campaign called Driven 2 Research. The charity raises money and awareness for cancer research in Canada. He also supported and walked the runway in the Heart Truth Fundraiser with CTV Sports anchor Lisa Bowes in 2014. The event was for the Heart and Stroke Foundation of Canada, with Verra making a donation on behalf of his Grandmother's heart attack survival and donated a 2-seater IndyCar ride to the event.

References

External links
 Ryan Verra official website

Living people
Canadian racing drivers
Formula 3 Sudamericana drivers
Atlantic Championship drivers
U.S. F2000 National Championship drivers
1982 births
Brazilian Formula Three Championship drivers